Gallini may refer to:

 Gallini (surname), an Italian surname
 Gallini (bird), a tribe of gamebird including francolins, bamboo partridges, and junglefowl (including the chicken)